The MTV Fandom Awards was an annual pop culture, television and film awards show presented by MTV with awards voted on by fans.

Ceremonies

Categories

Best New Fandom of the Year

Fandom of the Year

Feels Freak Out of the Year

Ship of the Year

Fandom Army of the Year

Animation Fandom of the Year

Social Superstar of the Year

Best Fandom Forever

Best Revival Fandom

References

External links
 

MTV
Awards established in 2014
2014 establishments in the United States
American television awards
American film awards
Popular culture